The 2023 Rutgers Scarlet Knights football team is an American football team that will represent Rutgers University in the East Division of the Big Ten Conference during the 2022 NCAA Division I FBS football season. The Scarlet Knights expect to be led by Greg Schiano  in the fourth year of his second stint (15th overall season) as Rutgers' head coach.

The Scarlet Knights play their home games at SHI Stadium in Piscataway, New Jersey.

Schedule

References

Rutgers
Rutgers Scarlet Knights football seasons
2023 in sports in New Jersey